The Duellists is a 1977 British historical drama film and the feature film directorial debut of Ridley Scott. It won the Best Debut Film award at the 1977 Cannes Film Festival. The basis of the screenplay is the Joseph Conrad short story "The Duel" (titled "Point of Honor" in the United States) published in A Set of Six.

A novelization of the film by Gordon Williams, which included historical contexts and slightly expanded the plot, was published by Fontana Books in Great Britain in 1977 and by Pocket Books in the United States in 1978.

Plot

Strasbourg 1800 

In Strasbourg in 1800, Lieutenant Gabriel Feraud of the French 7th Hussars, a fervent Bonapartist and obsessive duellist, nearly kills the nephew of the city's mayor in a duel. Under pressure from the mayor, Brigadier-General Treillard orders one of his officers, Lieutenant Armand d'Hubert of the 3rd Hussars, to place Feraud under house arrest. When d'Hubert delivers the order, Feraud takes it as a personal insult and challenges him to a duel. The result is inconclusive, as Feraud gets knocked unconscious before the fight ends. While trying to assist him, d'Hubert is attacked and facially scratched by Feraud's mistress. As a result of the fight, the general dismisses d'Hubert from his staff and returns him to active duty with his regiment.

Augsburg 1801 
The war interrupts the quarrel and the two do not meet again until six months later. Feraud challenges d'Hubert to another duel and seriously wounds him. While recovering, d'Hubert takes fencing lessons and in the next duel, the men fight to a bloody standstill. Soon afterwards, d'Hubert is relieved to learn he has been promoted to captain, as military discipline forbids officers of different ranks from duelling.

Lubeck 1806
D'Hubert starts serving in Lübeck. He is shocked to hear that the 7th Hussars have arrived in the city and that Feraud is now also a captain. Aware that in two weeks time he is to be promoted to major, d'Hubert attempts to slip away but fails to do it in time. Feraud challenges him to another duel. Before it, d'Hubert happens upon his former mistress Laura. She chastises him for continuing to duel Feraud, saying that he will eventually be killed, before bidding him a tearful farewell. In the encounter, d'Hubert slashes Feraud's forehead; with blood flowing into his eyes, Feraud can no longer see to fight. Considering himself the victor, d'Hubert leaves the field ebullient. Soon afterwards, Feraud's regiment is posted to Spain while d'Hubert remains stationed in Northern Europe.

Russia 1812
The pair (both now colonels) chance upon each other during the French Army's retreat from Moscow, but are forced to cooperate after being separated from the main force. Russian Cossacks attack, forcing d'Hubert and Feraud to fight together instead of against each other. After they have driven off the enemy, d'Hubert offers Feraud a celebratory drink from his flask, but Feraud silently turns and walks away.

Tours 1814
After Napoleon's exile to Elba, d'Hubert is now a brigadier-general recovering from a wound at the home of his sister Leonie in Tours. She introduces him to Adele, the niece of her neighbour, and the couple fall in love. Colonel Perteley, a Bonapartist agent, attempts to recruit d'Hubert as rumours of Napoleon's imminent return from exile abound, but d'Hubert refuses. When Feraud, now a Bonapartist brigadier-general, learns this, he declares he always knew d'Hubert was a traitor.

Paris 1816
After Napoleon is defeated at Waterloo, d'Hubert marries Adele and joins the army of Louis XVIII. Feraud is arrested and is expected to be executed for his part in the Hundred Days war. Learning of this, d'Hubert calls upon the Minister of Police and persuades him to spare Feraud. Not knowing d'Hubert saved him, Feraud is paroled to live under police supervision. Meanwhile, d'Hubert and Adele prepare for the birth of their first child.

After learning of d'Hubert's promotion in the new French Army, Feraud sends two of his former officers to d'Hubert with a challenge for a pistol duel. Reluctantly, d'Hubert agrees. The two men meet in a ruined château, entering the woods from opposite sides. However, Feraud is tricked into discharging both his pistols and d'Hubert catches him at point blank range. Instead of shooting him, d'Hubert says that the rules of single combat dictate that he now owns Feraud's life. From now on, in all future dealings between them, Feraud must "conduct [himself] as a dead man". As such, he can never again challenge d'Hubert to a duel.

With that, d'Hubert returns to his life and happy marriage. Meanwhile, a solitary Feraud faces ending his days in provincial exile, locked away like his beloved Emperor, and unable to pursue the obsession of dueling that has consumed him for so many years.

Cast

 Keith Carradine as Armand d'Hubert
 Harvey Keitel as Gabriel Feraud
 Albert Finney as Joseph Fouché, Minister of Police
 Edward Fox as Colonel Perteley, a Bonapartist agent
 Cristina Raines as Adele, later d'Hubert's wife
 Robert Stephens as Brigadier-General Treillard
 Tom Conti as Dr Jacquin, an army surgeon and friend of d'Hubert
 John McEnery as Feraud's tall second in the final duel
 Arthur Dignam as d'Hubert's one-eyed second in the final duel
 Diana Quick as Laura, d'Hubert's mistress
 Alun Armstrong as Lieutenant Lecourbe, a friend of d'Hubert
 Maurice Colbourne as Feraud's second
 Gay Hamilton as Feraud's mistress
 Meg Wynn Owen as Leonie, d'Hubert's sister
 Jenny Runacre as Madame de Lionne, a lady in Strasbourg
 Alan Webb as the Chevalier du Rivarol, Adele's uncle
 Matthew Guinness as the Mayor of Strasbourg's nephew
 Dave Hill as Cuirassier
 William Hobbs as Swordsman
 W. Morgan Sheppard as the fencing master
 Liz Smith as the fortune teller
 Hugh Fraser as Officer
 Michael Irving as Officer
 Tony Matthews as Treillard's aide-de-camp
 Pete Postlethwaite as Treillard's orderly (this was his first feature film appearance)
 Stacy Keach as the Narrator (voice only)

Production

Development
The Duellists would mark the feature film debut of Ridley Scott, who had previously made television commercials. Its visual style was influenced by Stanley Kubrick's historical drama Barry Lyndon (1975). In both films, duels play an essential role. In his commentary for the DVD release of the film, Scott comments that he was trying to emulate the lush cinematography of Kubrick's film, which approached the naturalistic paintings of the era depicted.

Due to budgetary constraints, Scott decided to shoot the film in a series of tableaux to indicate chapters of the story. The film was made with advice from military historian Richard Holmes.

Writing

Scott initially hired Gerald Vaughan-Hughes to write a story about Guy Fawkes and the 1605 Gunpowder Plot, but when financing fell through, Vaughan-Hughes adapted the screenplay from the 1907 novella The Duel by British-Polish writer Joseph Conrad. The genesis of Conrad's story were the real duels during the Napoleonic era between two officers in France's Grande Armée, Pierre Dupont de l'Étang and François Fournier-Sarlovèze, who became D’Hubert and Feraud in The Duel. In The Encyclopedia of the Sword, Nick Evangelista wrote:

The pair fought their first duel in 1794 from which Fournier-Sarlovèze - known as the “worst subject of the Grande Armée” - demanded a rematch. At least another 30 rematches then occurred over the next 19 years in which the two officers fought mounted and on foot with swords, sabres, and pistols. After l'Étang finally bested Fournier-Sarlovèze in a duel, he told him to leave him alone for good. Fournier-Sarlovèze died aged 53;  l'Étang lived till he was 74.

Although Vaughan-Hughes screenplay used many elements from The Duel, it created new scenes like the duels at the start and the end of the film and new characters.

Filming
Many exteriors were shot in and around Sarlat-la-Canéda in the Dordogne region of France. The winter scenes set during the retreat from Moscow were shot in the Cairngorms of Scotland, near Aviemore. The final duel scene was filmed at the unrestored Château de Commarque.

The last scene references paintings of the former emperor in his South Atlantic exile (e.g. Napoleon on Saint Helena by Franz Josef Sandmann).

Critical reception
 
The film holds a 93% rating on Rotten Tomatoes based on 27 reviews, with an average score of 7.4/10 and the critical consensus: "Rich, stylized visuals work with effective performances in Ridley Scott's take on Joseph Conrad's Napoleonic story, resulting in an impressive feature film debut for the director."

Vincent Canby of The New York Times wrote: "The movie, set during the Napoleonic Wars, uses its beauty much in the way that other movies use soundtrack music, to set mood, to complement scenes and even to contradict them.  Sometimes it's all too much, yet the camerawork, which is by Frank Tidy, provides the Baroque style by which the movie operates on our senses, making the eccentric drama at first compelling and ultimately breathtaking." Pauline Kael of The New Yorker wrote, "The Duellists is an epic yarn; we sit back and observe it, and it's consistently entertaining—and eerily beautiful." Gene Siskel of the Chicago Tribune gave the film two-and-a-half stars out of four and wrote, "The story might have worked if there were an undercurrent of attractiveness to Keitel's loutish character. But he is an unwavering boor from start to finish, and his prowess with weapons is in no way redeeming." Variety wrote that Ridley Scott "does have an eye for fine compositions, period recreation and arresting tableaus. But it is somewhat surface and too taken up with poses… it rarely illuminates the deeper human aspects of these two flailing men."

Charles Champlin of the Los Angeles Times wrote that the sword fights were "the best I've ever seen" and called the story "refreshingly different from standard film content." Michael Webb of The Washington Post wrote, "The film has the pictorial beauty and rich period sense of Barry Lyndon (1975), but adds the narrative drive and passion that Kubrick's film lacked." David Ansen of Newsweek wrote, "The best you can say about the film – the directing debut of Ridley Scott – is that it provides an unusually civilized experience in these days of movie barbarism…  The worst that can be said is that Keitel and Carradine are so perversely cast as French hussars that, whenever they speak, the splendid illusion of nineteenth-century Europe is shattered."

The film is lauded for its historically authentic portrayal of Napoleonic uniforms and military conduct, as well as its generally accurate early-19th-century fencing techniques as recreated by fight choreographer William Hobbs.

The film is included in the second edition of The New York Times Guide to the Best 1,000 Movies Ever Made, published in 2004.

Home media
On 29 January 2013, Shout! Factory released the film on Blu-ray. The release coincided with the publication of an essay on the film in a collection of scholarly essays on Ridley Scott.

References

External links

 
 
 "The Duel" – Full text of the short story by Joseph Conrad on which the film is based.
 Keith Carradine Discusses 'The Duellists' at Virginia Film Festival, November 3, 2012

1970s historical drama films
1977 films
British historical drama films
Fictional rivalries
Films based on short fiction
Films based on works by Joseph Conrad
Films about duels
Films directed by Ridley Scott
Films produced by David Puttnam
Films scored by Howard Blake
Films set in France
Films set in Germany
Films set in Russia
Films set in 1800
Films set in 1801
Films set in 1806
Films set in 1812
Films set in 1814
Films set in 1816
Napoleonic Wars films
Films shot in France
1977 directorial debut films
1977 drama films
1970s English-language films
1970s British films